Aisby is a hamlet in the civil parish of Corringham, in the  West Lindsey district of Lincolnshire, England.

Aisby is listed in the 1086 Domesday Book as "Aseby", in the Corringham Hundred of West Riding of Lindsey. It comprised 8 households, with 1 smallholder and 7 freemen. In 1066 Earl Edwin was Lord of the Manor; by 1086 this had been transferred to King William, who also became Tenant-in-chief.

Old Hall, a Grade II listed building in Aisby, originates from the 14th century, with 17th-century alterations, and substantial alterations and additions in the 19th and 20th centuries.

References

External links 
 

Hamlets in Lincolnshire
West Lindsey District